Ralph Edwin Church (May 5, 1883 – March 21, 1950) was an American lawyer and Republican politician. He served in the Illinois House of Representatives from 1917 to 1932 and then represented the northern suburbs of Chicago in the United States House of Representatives for seven terms. He died in office in 1950 while testifying at a congressional hearing.

Early life and career
Church was born on a farm near Catlin, Illinois in Vermillion County, Illinois. He went to Danville High School in Danville, Illinois. He received his bachelor's degree from University of Michigan and his master's and law degrees from Northwestern University. Church was admitted to  the Illinois bar in 1909 and practiced law in Chicago, Illinois. He lived with his wife Marguerite S. Church and their family in Evanston, Illinois. He served in the United States Army during World War I.

Political career
Church served in the Illinois House of Representatives from 1917 to 1932 as a Republican. Church then served in the United States House of Representatives from 1935 to 1941 and from 1943 until his death in 1950. Church died suddenly while giving testimony before a Congressional House committee about expenditures. His wife Marguerite was elected in a special election to succeed her husband in the United States House of Representatives.

See also
 List of United States Congress members who died in office (1950–99)

References

External links

Memorial services held in the House of Representatives of the United States, together with remarks presented in eulogy of Ralph Edwin Church, late a representative from Illinois frontispiece 1950"

1883 births
1950 deaths
People from Evanston, Illinois
People from Vermilion County, Illinois
Military personnel from Illinois
Republican Party members of the Illinois House of Representatives
Lawyers from Chicago
Northwestern University alumni
University of Michigan alumni
Republican Party members of the United States House of Representatives from Illinois
20th-century American politicians
Burials in Illinois
20th-century American lawyers